Psylliodes chrysocephala or Psylliodes chrysocephalus, commonly known as the cabbage-stem flea beetle, is a species of leaf beetle situated in the subfamily Galerucinae and the tribe Alticini (flea beetles).

Description
P. chrysocephala measures 3.0–4.0 mm in length. It is variably coloured, but most often a dark metallic blue. Like all flea beetles it has large hind femora which it can use to jump. These are orange-red in colour with the hind femora darkened.

It is differentiated from other members of the genus through a lack of anterior angles on its pronotum, the punctures on top of the head being as coarse as those on the elytra, and its first front tarsal segment being equal in length to its third.

Distribution
It is native to the Western Palaearctic, including Macaronesia, Cape Verde and North Africa and has been introduced into Canada.

Lifecycle
Adult beetles mate in late August on the leaves of host plants, with eggs first laid 5–10 days after copulation. Oviposition takes place from the end of September through winter until mid-April and a single female may lay up to 1000 eggs, deposited in small clusters in the soil beneath the host plant at depths of 1–5 cm. Larvae hatch after about 60 days and feed within the stem and leaves of the host plant. Fully developed larvae emerge in early summer and pupate in the soil. Newly emerged adults appear from May each year. Adults may enter an aestivation period over Summer after the harvest of mature rape plants. After mating in late summer, some adults will overwinter.

Behaviour and habitat

P. crysocephala can be found in various habitats, depending on the availability of a host plant. It is particularly associated with wild and cultivated members of the plant family Brassicaceae. It has been directly associated with Brassica napus, B. nigra (black mustard), B. oleracea (cabbages, cauliflowers), B. rapa (turnip rape), Nasturtium officinale (watercress), Raphanus sativus (radish), Sinapis alba (white mustard), S. arvensis (wild mustard), and Tropaeolum majus (common nasturtium).

As an arable pest
It is a serious pest of rape in northern Europe. In central parts of Europe it has a cyclic appearance with peaks in populations at intervals of about seven years. In the UK, it is the most important establishment pest of rape, leading to yield losses of up to 20%.

References

External links
High reoslution images of Psylliodes crysocephala

Agricultural pest insects
Beetles of Europe
Taxa named by Carl Linnaeus
Alticini
Beetles of North America
Beetles described in 1758